Argo 16 was the codename of an Italian Air Force C-47 Dakota aircraft, registration MM61832, used by the Italian Secret Service SID and the U.S. Central Intelligence Agency (CIA) in covert operations.

History
On 23 November 1973, at 7:30 Argo 16 took off from the airport of Venice, arrived at the altitude of 2,500 feet, then fell and crashed into the Montefibre plant of Marghera, located in an industrial park close the airport. The disaster caused four deaths, including Commander Borreo, an experienced and highly decorated pilot who flew during the Second World War. The code name of the plane Argo 16, was named for the giant mythological all-seeing Argus Panoptes. The aeroplane conducted electronic observation missions in the Adriatic Sea for the Secret Service against the Yugoslavian radar network. According to Luigi, Borreo`s father, the commander of the crew of the Argo 16, Anano Borreo, feared for his life: he was aware that his work placed him at the centre of delicate and dangerous situations. General Gianadelio Maletti (SID) attributed the disaster to sabotage carried out by the Israeli Secret Service. The RAI dossier "Argo 16 - Un mistero mai chiarito", however, concluded that the cause of the crash will likely remain a mystery.

References

Aviation accidents and incidents in Italy
Conspiracy theories in Europe
Aviation accidents and incidents in 1973
1973 in Italy
Mass murder in 1973
Accidents and incidents involving military aircraft
Airliner bombings
Terrorist incidents in Italy
November 1973 events
Terrorist incidents in Italy in 1973
Accidents and incidents involving the Douglas C-47 Skytrain